An independent bookstore is a retail bookstore which is independently owned. Usually, independent stores consist of only a single actual store (although there are some multi-store independents). They may be structured as sole proprietorships, closely held corporations or partnerships, cooperatives, or nonprofits. Independent stores can be contrasted with chain bookstores, which have many locations and are owned by large corporations, which often have other divisions besides bookselling.

Social role

Author events at independent bookstores sometimes take the role of literary salons and independents historically supported new authors and independent presses.

U.S. decline and renaissance

For most of the 20th century, almost all bookstores in the United States were independent. In the 1950s, automobiles and suburban shopping malls became more common. Mall-based bookstore chains began in the 1960s, and underwent a major expansion in numbers in the 1970s and 1980s, especially B. Dalton and Waldenbooks. Big-box chains also expanded during this period, including Barnes & Noble (which also acquired Texas chain Bookstop), Borders, and Crown Books. Amazon was founded during the dot-com boom in 1994 and exclusively sold books until 1998.

By the 1990s, these competitive pressures had put independent bookstores under considerable financial pressure and many closed due to their inability to compete. Closures in the United States include Kroch's and Brentano's (1995) in Chicago, Gotham Book Mart (2006) in New York, Cody's Books (2008) in Berkeley, Kepler's Books (2005) in Menlo Park, Printers Inc. Bookstore (2001) in Palo Alto, A Clean Well-Lighted Place for Books (2006) in San Francisco, Midnight Special Bookstore (2004) in Santa Monica, Dutton's Books (2008) in Los Angeles, Coliseum Books (2007) in New York City, and Wordsworth Books (2004) in Cambridge. The number of independent booksellers in the United States dropped 40% from 1995 to 2000.

In the 2000s, e-books started to take market share away from printed books, either published directly via the World Wide Web, or read on e-ink devices such as the Amazon Kindle, introduced in 2007. Amazon continued to gain significant market share, and these competitive pressures resulted in a collapse of the chain stores in the 2010s. Crown closed in 2001; Borders, B. Dalton, and Waldenbooks were liquidated in 2010-11. A smaller Barnes & Noble, with its Nook e-reader was left as the only nation-wide chain, with the second-largest Books-A-Million operating in only 32 states. This collapse created an opening for the return of more independent shops.

According to the American Booksellers Association, the number of independent U.S. bookstores increased 35%, from 1,651 in 2009 to 2,227 in 2015. A Harvard Business School study by professor Ryan Raffaelli attributed this increase to the buy local movement and success in curation of interesting titles and hosting book-oriented community events. The market has bifurcated between consumers looking for a highly interactive experience at local stores, and consumers looking for low-cost, high-selection stores where large chains compete with difficulty against online sales.

Portrayal in film
Two documentary films, Indies Under Fire (2006) and Paperback Dreams (2008), explore the difficulties faced by U.S. independent bookstores in the new economy.

The competition between chain and independent retailers was fictionalized in the 1998 film You've Got Mail.

See also
Feminist bookstore
Religious bookstore

References

External links
American Bookseller's Association (United States)
Independent Online Booksellers Association
How Independent Bookstores Have Thrived in Spite of Amazon.com